Antigambra is a genus of moths belonging to the family Tineidae. It contains only one species, Antigambra amphitrocta, which is found in Zimbabwe and South Africa.

References

Tineidae
Lepidoptera of South Africa
Lepidoptera of Zimbabwe
Moths of Sub-Saharan Africa
Monotypic moth genera
Tineidae genera